The Seattle Sounders were an American professional soccer team that was founded in 1994 and played in several second-division leagues, beginning with the American Professional Soccer League. They played in the A-League, later renamed the USL First Division, from 1997 to 2008. The team was named for the Seattle Sounders of the North American Soccer League (NASL), which folded in 1983. The Sounders folded after the 2008 season as part of a transition to a new Major League Soccer (MLS) team named Seattle Sounders FC that debuted in 2009.

The team generally used blue and white jerseys. They played at Memorial Stadium and various small venues from 1994 until their move to Qwest Field (now Lumen Field) in 2003. The Sounders played their last season at the Starfire Sports Complex in Tukwila, Washington, now the main training facility for the MLS team. Their head coach from 2002 to 2008 was Brian Schmetzer, who had played for the NASL Sounders and later coached the MLS team. A sister organization, the Seattle Sounders Women, played in the women's USL W-League from 2001 to 2015.

History

The club was founded in 1994 and named after the original Seattle Sounders team, which played from 1974 to 1983 in the North American Soccer League. Former coach Alan Hinton had acquired rights to the Sounders name after the club folded and began a campaign to bring an American Professional Soccer League (APSL; later the A-League) team to the city in 1992. The league previously had another Seattle team, the Seattle Storm, that played for one season in 1990 and later folded.

A bid for a new APSL team, to be named the Sounders and owned by former Microsoft executives Scott Oki and Neil Farnsworth, was announced in September 1993. The bid's approval was announced by United States Soccer Federation secretary general Hank Steinbrecher on January 30, 1994, during a men's international friendly match between the United States and Russia at the Kingdome that was attended by 43,651 spectators. The reborn Sounders competed with a rival group that aimed to create a Seattle franchise for Major League Soccer, the new top-level soccer league for the United States. Hinton was named club president and later appointed himself as head coach prior to the inaugural season.

The Sounders played their inaugural season at the Tacoma Dome and Memorial Stadium. The Sounders finished the 1994 season with a 14–6 record, the best in the A-League, but lost in the first round of the playoffs to the Colorado Foxes. Hinton resigned as head coach and club president in 1996 and transferred the rights to the Sounders name to Oki. The Sounders played in the 1996 CONCACAF Champions' Cup and advanced to the final round in Guatemala City, where they finished at the bottom of a four-team group. They were the second Seattle-based team to play in the continental championship, after the Seattle Mitre Eagles in the 1988 edition, who also lost to Cruz Azul.

For the 1999 season, the team played at Renton Memorial Stadium, a 6,500-seat suburban venue in Renton, while Memorial Stadium in Seattle underwent renovations. The Sounders had an average attendance of 6,132 in 1994, but declined to 2,100 by 1999; the club had also lost its profitability during this time. They attracted more spectators in Renton, but found group sales had declined and needed more locker room space for their various teams; in 2000, the Sounders returned to Memorial Stadium.

The Sounders formed a partnership with the German side Werder Bremen in 1998 due to Sounders USL-PDL player Andrew Dallman's involvement with the German side via US indoor soccer legends Fernando Clavijo, Raffaele Ruotolo, and Jean Willrich. The team also formed a partnership with English side Cambridge United in 2006 due to the shared involvement of Adrian Hanauer, who bought the Sounders in 2002.

The Sounders earned four A-League championships, winning the league cup in 1995, 1996, 2005, and 2007. Seattle finished with the best regular season record in the league in 1994, 2002, and 2007. In addition to their titles, the Sounders finished as runners-up in the league cup to Montreal in 2004. In 2005, Seattle drew the Richmond Kickers 1–1 at Qwest Field before claiming the championship 4–3 in penalty kicks. In 2007, the Sounders defeated the Atlanta Silverbacks 4–0 to claim their fourth championship title.

The team primarily played at Memorial Stadium, which was aging and in need of repairs, and later Seahawks Stadium (Qwest Field) beginning in 2003 despite their low average attendance. Seahawks Stadium had been designed to be used by a future MLS team, but an expansion team had not been granted after it opened. In the early 2000s, the team considered plans to build a soccer-specific stadium with approximately 15,000 to 20,000 seats and a complex of fields in various suburbs, including Fife and Kent. In 2006, the Sounders proposed a stadium at the Kitsap County Faigrounds in Bremerton, one of Seattle's western suburbs in Kitsap County. A 6,500-seat stadium was proposed again in 2007 as the home of a possible Major League Soccer franchise. A move to Tacoma or folding the club were also considered in the event that a rival MLS bid won rights to an expansion team in Seattle, according to Hanauer.

MLS expansion and final season

The Sounders looked to earn an MLS expansion team in the 1990s and 2000s while also competing with other prospective ownership groups. In 2000, the club announced plans to pursue a MLS team that would play in the then-unbuilt Seahawks Stadium (now Lumen Field) and keep the A-League franchise as a developmental team named "Sounders Premier". USL Sounders owner Adrian Hanauer also made a bid for a 2005 expansion slot that was instead awarded to Real Salt Lake. On November 13, 2007, Major League Soccer (MLS) announced that it had selected Seattle as the recipient of an expansion team that would begin play at Qwest Field in 2009. USL Sounders owner Adrian Hanauer would become one of the team's owners, along with Drew Carey, Paul Allen and majority owner Joe Roth.

The team's name, Seattle Sounders FC, was unveiled on April 7, 2008, continuing the Sounders name into MLS. The USL team would play their last season in 2008, mostly at the Starfire Sports Complex in Tukwila. The Sounders made their second consecutive appearance in the U.S. Open Cup semifinals, where they lost to fellow USL-1 club Charleston Battery in a penalty shootout. Following a regular season that finished with a 10–10–10 record, the second-division team were eliminated from the playoffs in the first round by the Montreal Impact and played their last competitive match on September 28, 2008. The Sounders played a series of exhibition matches in Argentina against the reserve squads of local clubs as part of a farewell tour in late October 2008. They won all six matches, which also served as a tryout for the MLS team for the existing members of the USL team.

Year-by-year

This is a complete list of seasons for the A-League/USL club. For a season-by-season history including the current Seattle Sounders FC MLS franchise, see List of Seattle Sounders FC seasons.

1. Avg. attendance include statistics from league matches only.
2. Top goalscorer(s) includes all goals scored in League, MLS Cup, U.S. Open Cup, CONCACAF Champions League, FIFA Club World Cup, and other competitive continental matches.
3. Points and PPG have been adjusted from non-traditional to traditional scoring systems for seasons prior to 2003 to more effectively compare historical team performance across seasons.

Honors

Team honors
League Championship
 Winner (4): 1995, 1996, 2005, 2007
 Runner-up (1): 2004

Commissioner's Cup (Top of the Regular Season Table)
 Winner (3): 1994, 2002, 2007

Pacific Division Champion
 Winner (3): 2000, 2002, 2003
 Runner-up (2): 1997, 1998

Western Conference Champion
 Winner (1): 2004

Cascadia Cup
 Winner (2): 2006, 2007

Individual player honors
MVP
 1995 – Peter Hattrup
 1998 – Mark Baena
 2002 – Leighton O'Brien
 2007 – Sebastian Le Toux

Leading scorer
 1995 – Peter Hattrup
 1998 – Mark Baena
 1999 – Niall Thompson
 2006 – Cam Weaver
 2007 – Sebastian Le Toux (tied)

Goalkeeper of the Year
 1994 – Marcus Hahnemann
 1995 – Marcus Hahnemann
 1997 – Dusty Hudock

Defender of the Year
 2005 – Taylor Graham

Coach of the Year
 1994 – Alan Hinton
 2000 – Neil Megson
 2002 – Brian Schmetzer

Rookie of the Year
 1994 – Jason Dunn
 2000 – Greg Howes
 2006 – Cam Weaver

First team All Star
 1994 – Marcus Hahnemann, Neil Megson, Shawn Medved, Chance Fry
 1995 – Marcus Hahnemann, Peter Hattrup
 1996 – Wade Webber
 1997 – Dusty Hudock, Mark Watson
 1998 – Mark Baena
 1999 – Mark Baena
 2000 – Darren Sawatzky
 2001 – Leighton O'Brien
 2002 – Andrew Gregor, Leighton O'Brien, Brian Ching
 2003 – Danny Jackson, Andrew Gregor
 2005 – Taylor Graham
 2008 – Taylor Graham

Head coaches
Note: A-League/USL First Division did not have draws until 2000.

Stadiums
 Tacoma Dome, Tacoma (1994)
 Memorial Stadium, Seattle (1994–1998)
 Renton Memorial Stadium, Renton, Washington (1999), due to construction at Seattle Center
 Interbay Stadium, occasional matches (2002)
 Memorial Stadium, Seattle, Washington (2000–2003)
 Huskies Soccer Field, U.S. Open Cup match (2003)
 Qwest Field (formerly Seahawks Stadium and CenturyLink Field; now Lumen Field), Seattle, Washington (2003–2007)
 Starfire Sports Complex, Tukwila, Washington (2005–2006 occasional games, 2008)

The Sounders originally played at Memorial Stadium, with select matches at other venues such as the Tacoma Dome, and moved to Qwest Field (originally Seahawks Stadium) in 2003. The Sounders and the Sounders Select Women played the first-ever sporting event at the stadium on July 28, 2002, before 25,515 fans—setting an A-League attendance record. After opening the 2008 season at Qwest Field, the Sounders played their remaining 14 league home fixtures at Starfire Sports Complex.

Various exhibition matches against A-League and MLS opponents were played at local high schools, including Marysville Pilchuck in 1998  and Mount Vernon in 1999.

Affiliated teams

The Sounders founded a developmental USL Premier Development League (PDL) team, named Seattle Sounders Select, in 1999. They replaced the Seattle BigFoot, an independent team who had been considered an unofficial development squad. In the second round of the 2001 U.S. Open Cup, they eliminated MLS side Dallas Burn and advanced further than their parent club, losing to the Los Angeles Galaxy in the third round. The team had financial troubles and folded after the 2002 season after failing to pay for its $85,000 budget. The Sounders later formed a relationship with a new PDL franchise, the Tacoma Tides, which was established in 2006.

A women's team, named Seattle Sounders Select Women, began play in 2000 and moved to the USL W-League the following year. The team was rebranded as Seattle Sounders Women in 2003 and was sold in 2008 to Tacoma Tides owner Mike Jennings as part of preparations for the USL–MLS transition. The Sounders Women was temporarily home to several national team players in 2012 following the collapse of Women's Professional Soccer. The Sounders Women left the W-League when it folded in 2015 and moved to the Women's Premier Soccer League, where they won their first national championship in 2018. The team terminated their branding agreement with the MLS Sounders in January 2020 and were renamed Sound FC.

Rivalries

The Sounders had two rivals—the Portland Timbers to the south and the Vancouver Whitecaps to the north. All three teams were successors to their respective NASL teams that competed in the 1970s and 1980s. They competed in the annual Cascadia Cup, which was established by fan organizations in 2004 and has been contested by the teams' MLS successors since 2011. The Sounders won the trophy in 2006 and 2007.

Supporters

The original Seattle Sounders were supported by the Seattle Sounders Booster Club in the 1970s and early 1980s. A small group named "The Pod", named for the Sounders' orca mascot, formed to support the second incarnation of the club in the 1990s. The Emerald City Supporters were formed in 2005 to organize fans and perform songs, chants, and displays during matches. They remained with the club when the Sounders moved to MLS in 2009. The Sounders organization created an official fan club, named the Sounders Legion, in 2007.

References

External links
 Seattle Sounders FC on HistoryLink

 
American Professional Soccer League teams
Association football clubs established in 1994
Association football clubs disestablished in 2008
USL First Division teams
U.S. clubs in CONCACAF Champions' Cup
A-League (1995–2004) teams
1984 establishments in Washington (state)
2008 disestablishments in Washington (state)